Brian Sergent (born 29 December 1959) is an actor born and based in Wellington, New Zealand.

Background
Sergent’s acting career began at age 15 playing Lionel in the soap opera, Close to Home.

In television Sergeant is known for playing Eric on Outrageous Fortune, the New Zealand Prime Minister on Flight of the Conchords, and Harold in The Lost Children.
One of his most popular characters, cabin steward Gavin Soper, appeared on the Pulp Comedy television series.

Sergent has a strong association with Circa Theatre in Wellington. He performed in  The Duchess of Malfi (1982), Travels with My Aunt (1997) and Take a Chance on Me (2001).

Sergent’s film credits include Peter Jackson’s Meet the Feebles, Braindead and Lord of the Rings, Absent Without Leave, Via Satellite, the lead role as Marty in The Shirt and Jonah in Eagle vs. Shark.

Radio listeners are quite familiar with Sergent's reading of short stories, novels and radio plays on Radio New Zealand where he is still actively involved.

Sergent has won multiple Chapman Tripp Theatre Awards for acting and writing. In 1992 he won Male Actor of the Year for his performances as Lenny in The Homecoming at the Circa Theatre and Alfredo Traps in A Dangerous Game at the BATS Theatre. In 1994, he won Best Male Actor in a Supporting Role for his performance of Gary Peter Lefkowitz in I Hate Hamlet at the Circa. In 2004, he won the award for Outstanding New Playwright of the Year for his play The Love of Humankind.

After taking a break from the show for nearly three years, Sergent returned to Outrageous Fortune as Eric in the second to last episode of the fifth season.

Filmography

Film

Television

Theatre

References 

1959 births
Living people
New Zealand male television actors
New Zealand male film actors
New Zealand male comedians
New Zealand male stage actors
New Zealand male voice actors
New Zealand male soap opera actors
20th-century New Zealand male actors
21st-century New Zealand male actors